Dutchtown, New Jersey may refer to:

Dutchtown, Atlantic County, New Jersey
Dutchtown, Somerset County, New Jersey